Actors Equity of Australia was an Australian trade union representing actors and other performers. It existed from 1920 to 1993.

It was established as the Actors' Federation of Australasia in 1920. It was renamed Actors' Equity of Australia in 1936, and again to Actors and Announcers' Equity of Australia in 1945 following the collapse of the Announcers' Association of Australia. It reverted to the Actors' Equity of Australia name in 1983.

Actor and comedian Hal Lashwood was a key figure in its establishment and its president for 25 years.

It ceased to exist in 1993, when it merged with the Australian Theatrical and Amusement Employees' Association and the Australian Journalists' Association to form the Media, Entertainment and Arts Alliance.

References

Actors' trade unions
Defunct trade unions of Australia
Trade unions disestablished in 1993
Trade unions established in 1920